Excuse Me Maadam is an Indian comedy television series that has been broadcast since 14 September 2020 on Star Bharat and digitally available on Disney+ Hotstar. Produced by Sanjay Kohli, it stars Rajesh Kumar, Nyra Banerjee and Sucheta Khanna.
The serial is sequel of Life Ok serial May I Come In Madam?.

Cast

Main
 Rajesh Kumar as Sanam "Sanu" Harjaayi; Kranti's husband
 Nyra Banerjee as Mithu aka "Maadam"; Sanam's boss
 Sucheta Khanna as Kranti Sanam Harjaayi; Sanam's wife

Recurring
 Sapna Sikarwar as Inspector Amarjyoti "Amar" Bharati; Kranti’s sister
 Anup Upadhyay as Adbhut "Adhu" Bharati; Amar’s husband
 Vishwanath Chatterjee as Mr. Chatterjee

References

External links
 

Hindi-language television shows
Indian television series
Star Bharat original programming
2020 Indian television series debuts
Indian comedy television series